Blade of the 47 Ronin is a 2022 American action-fantasy film directed by Ron Yuan, from a script co-written by John Swetnam, Aimee Garcia, and AJ Mendez, and is a sequel to the 47 Ronin. Set 300 years after its predecessor, the movie details the fight for survival of the final descendants of the 47 Ronin.

Blade of the 47 Ronin was released as a Netflix Original Film on October 25, 2022.

Premise
The continued story of ancient Japanese Rōnin warriors set 300 years after 47 Ronin, in a modern-day world where Samurai clans exist in complete secrecy.

Cast
 Anna Akana - Luna
 Mark Dacascos - Lord Shinshiro
 Teresa Ting - Onami
 Mike Moh - Reo
 Dustin Nguyen - Lord Nikko
 Yoshi Sudarso - Sun
 Luna Fujimoto - Mai
 Chris Pang - Lord Arai
 Daniel Southworth - Yurei
 Chikako Fukuyama - Aya
 Akira Koieyama - Ikeda
 Nino Furuhata - Dash
 Dai Tabuchi - Haruki
 Alexandra Tóth - Dancer

Production

Development
In August 2020, a sequel to 47 Ronin was announced to be in development with Ron Yuan serving as director. The project was described by the filmmaker as "genre-blending", as a combination of martial arts, action, horror and cyber-punk genres. The plot of the film will take place 300 years "into the future", and will be produced by Universal 1440 Entertainment and distributed by Netflix. Production is scheduled to begin in the first quarter of 2021.

In April 2021, Aimee Garcia and AJ Mendez joined the production as co-screenwriters; the pair of writing-collaborators' first feature film credit. By December 2021, it was revealed that John Swetnam had also joined the project as an additional screenwriter.

Casting
By December 2021, Anna Akana and Mark Dacascos joined the cast in leading roles; while Teresa Ting, Mike Moh, Dustin Nguyen, Yoshi Sudarso, and Chris Pang serve as the supporting cast.

Filming
Principal photography had commenced by December 2021 in Budapest, Hungary. Additionally, it was clarified that the plot will be set 300 years after the first film, as opposed to being set "in the future". The fictional plot, set in modern-day, centers around factions of Samurai who have operated in secrecy for centuries. The primary cast was announced, with Tim Kwok named as producer. The film will be a joint-venture production between Universal Pictures, Universal 1440 Entertainment, and Scrappy Heart Productions, and distributed by Netflix.

General Manager and Executive Vice President of Universal 1440 Entertainment, Glenn Ross, expressed excitement for the project while announcing the studio's intentions for the project to be the next installment in a "47 Ronin franchise".

Release
Blade of the 47 Ronin was released on October 25, 2022, via streaming by Universal Filmed Entertainment Group as a Netflix Original Film.

Future
In October 2022, following the popularity of Blade of the 47 Ronin through its streaming release, it was announced that a third film is in development.

References

External links
 

American fantasy action films
American sequel films
Films about the Forty-seven Ronin
Films shot in Budapest
Universal Pictures films
2022 films
2022 action films
2020s English-language films
2020s American films
American martial arts films
2022 martial arts films
Ninja films
Samurai films